Thout 11 - Coptic Calendar - Thout 13

The twelfth day of the Coptic month of Thout, the first month of the Coptic year. On a common year, this day corresponds to September 9, of the Julian Calendar, and September 22, of the Gregorian Calendar. This day falls in the Coptic season of Akhet, the season of inundation.

Commemoration

Feasts 
 Monthly commemoration of Archangel Michael
 Coptic New Year Period

Other commemorations 
 The assembly of the Third Ecumenical Council at Ephesus
 The translocation of the relics of Saint Clemus and his companions

References 

Days of the Coptic calendar